The quaestor hocicudo (Oxymycterus quaestor) is a species of rodent in the family Cricetidae. It is found in southeastern Brazil and northeastern Argentina, where it lives in forest and moist and dry scrub.

References

Oxymycterus
Mammals described in 1903
Taxa named by Oldfield Thomas